Andrea Bandini (born 16 February 1994) is an Italian footballer who plays as a full back.

Club career

Internazionale 
Bandini made his debut at Inter in the Europa League on 6 December 2012 replacing Jonathan in the 63rd minute against Neftchi Baku. In June 2013 Bandini (for €1 million) and Andrea Romanò (for €1.3 million) were part of the deal that Inter signed Alessandro Capello (for €2.5 million). In June 2014 they returned to their parent clubs for the original prices. Bandini signed a three-year contract in June 2014 with Inter.

Loan to Reggiana 
On 6 July 2013, Bandini was loaned to Lega Pro Prima Divisione side Reggiana on a season-long loan deal. He made his debut in Serie C on 22 September with a 2–0 away win over Carrarese, he played the entire match. On 27 April 2014, Bandini was sent off with a double yellow card in the 56th minute of a 3–2 away defeat against Vicenza. Belloni ended his season-long loan to Reggiana with 18 appearances, all as a starter and all in Serie C.

Loan to Prato 
On 9 July 2014, Bandini was signed on loan by Prato. On 10 August he made his debut with Prato in a 1–0 away defeat against Juve Stabia in the first round of Coppa Italia. He made his Serie C debut with Prato on 30 August in a 1–1 draw against San Marino Calcio. On 7 September, Bandini score his first professional goal for in the 61st minute of a 4–1 home defeat against Tuttocuoio. On 10 January 2015 he scored his second goal in a 2–0 home win over San Marino Calcio. Bandini ended his season-long loan to Prato with 34 appearances, including 25 as a starter, 2 goals and 2 assists.

Loan to Südtirol 
On 19 July 2015, Bandini was signed on loan by Serie C side Südtirol on a season-long loan deal. On 2 August, Bandini made his debut for Südtirol in the first round of Coppa Italia as a substitute replacing Massimiliano Tagliani in the 46th minute of a 1–0 away win over Matera. On 9 August he played in the second round of Coppa Italia, as a substitute replacing Fabian Tait in the 56th minute of a 2–0 away defeat against Pescara. On 6 September, Bandini made his debut for Südtirol in Serie C as a substitute replacing Hannes Fink in the 58th minute of a 1–0 away win over AlbinoLeffe. On 27 September he played his first full match for Südtirol, 2–0 home defeat against Bassano Virtus. Bandini ended his season-long loan to Südtirol with 28 appearances and 3 assists.

Loan to Mantova 
On 25 July 2016, he was signed by Serie C side Mantova on a season-long loan deal. He made his Serie C debut for Mantova on 27 August, he was replaced by Samuele Romeo in the 87th minute of a 1–1 away draw against Ancona. On 3 September, Bandini played his first entire match for Mantova, a 0–0 home draw against Venezia. On 24 September he score his first and only goal for Mantova in the 1st minute of a 2–1 home defeat against FeralpiSalò. He play his 100th professional match on 30 December against Venezia in a 3–1 away defeat. In this season with Mantova Baldini made 26 appearances, 1 goal and 1 assist all in Serie C.

Loan to Brescia 
On 31 August 2017 Bandini was signed on loan with option to buy by Brescia. On 3 October, Bandini made his debut for Brescia in Serie B, he was replaced by Tommaso Cancellotti in the 81st minute of a 1–1 away draw against Ternana. Bandini ended his season-long loan to Brescia with only 1 appearance.

Loan to Rimini 
On 25 July 2018, Bandini was loaned to Serie C club Rimini.

Career statistics

Club

Honours 
Inter Primavera
 Campionato Nazionale Primavera: 2011–12

References

1994 births
Footballers from Milan
Living people
Italian footballers
Association football defenders
Inter Milan players
A.C. Reggiana 1919 players
A.C. Prato players
F.C. Südtirol players
Mantova 1911 players
Brescia Calcio players
Rimini F.C. 1912 players
Serie B players
Serie C players